Chicago, (Chicago/State in station announcements) is an "L" station on the CTA's Red Line. It serves a significant portion of the Near North Side and Streeterville neighborhoods.  With 5,259,992 overall boardings in 2014, it is the busiest station on the Red Line north of the Loop.

Location
The second stop on the Red Line north of the Chicago River, Chicago station lies in the central portion of the Near North Side. Specifically, it is located underneath the intersection of State Street and Chicago Avenue. It is three blocks west of the northern section of the Magnificent Mile; the Chicago Water Tower is located on that strip at the intersection of Chicago and Michigan Avenues. It is also the closest 'L' station to the John Hancock Center, Holy Name Cathedral, the Rush Street entertainment district, and the downtown campus of Loyola University Chicago. The Chicago campus of the Moody Bible Institute is also nearby.

History

During the 1950s, the CTA implemented skip-stop service throughout the 'L' system. As a result, all trains stopped at these stations. The skip-stop service was ended due to budget cuts in the 1990s.

Renovation
From 1999 until 2001, Chicago underwent renovation and refurbishment, in line with other stations of the State Street subway. Work included making the station ADA-compliant, with new elevators, redone flooring, retiling, and increased mezzanine space.

There are entrances from street level at all corners of the intersection of North State Street and Chicago Avenue. One level below street level is a mezzanine containing fare controls and turnstiles, and the platforms are located beneath the mezzanine.

Bus connections
CTA
 36 Broadway
 66 Chicago (Owl Service)

See also
Chicago/Milwaukee
Chicago/Franklin

Notes and references

Notes

References

External links 
Chicago/State Station Page on the CTA official site
Chicago Avenue entrance from Google Maps Street View

CTA Red Line stations
Railway stations in the United States opened in 1943